Richard 'Ricky' Skerritt (born 7 June 1956) is a Saint Kitts and Nevis politician affiliated to the St Kitts and Nevis Labour Party. He held several portfolios in the country's ministry from 2004 to 2015. He has also been closely associated with cricket in the Caribbean and has acted as the manager of West Indies cricket team.

In March 2019, he was elected as the president of Cricket West Indies, along with his running mate, Dr. Kishore Shallow as vice president when they defeated the incumbents president Dave Cameron and vice president Emmanuel Nanthan by margins of 8–4 in a secret ballot.

Personal life 
Skerritt was born on 7 June 1956 in Saint Kitts. He has a bachelor's degree from the University of the Virgin Islands and a master's degree from Oxford University.

References

External links 
Official Website of Cricket West Indies

Cricket administration in the West Indies
1968 births
Living people
Alumni of the University of Oxford
University of the Virgin Islands alumni
Saint Lucian politicians